John Wesley Carroll (Wichita, Kansas 1892 - Albany, New York 1959) was an American painter known for his modernist portraits.

Biography 

John Carroll was born in Wichita, Kansas and grew up in San Francisco, California, and was active between 1920 and 1940.
He studied art at the University of California, Berkeley and was awarded a Guggenheim Fellowship, which allowed him to travel and work in Europe.
Among several others, his work has been exhibited at the New York Museum of Modern Art, the Whitney Museum, and the Detroit Institute of Arts.
He divided his time between his studio in New York City and his farm in East Chatham, New York where he raised cattle for the war effort.
Carroll died in Albany, NY in 1959.

Style 

Carroll was known for his romantic portraits of women 
His major influences included Paul Cézanne, George Bellows, and Andrew Dasburg.

]

References 

1892 births
1959 deaths
American portrait painters
University of California, Berkeley alumni